Euripus Mons is a mountain on the planet Mars. The name Euripus Mons is a classical albedo name. This was approved by International Astronomical Union in 2003. It is just east of Hellas Basin and is surrounded by debris flow.

See also 
 List of mountains on Mars

References

External links 
 Gazetteer of Planetary Nomenclature

Mountains on Mars
Hellas quadrangle